McDermott International, Ltd is a global provider of engineering and construction solutions to the energy industry. Operating in over 54 countries, McDermott has more than 40,000 employees, as well as a diversified fleet of speciality marine construction vessels and fabrication facilities around the world. Incorporated in Bermuda, It is headquartered in the Energy Corridor area of Houston, Texas.

History

1923–2000
In 1923, Ralph Thomas McDermott established J. Ray McDermott & Company Incorporated at the age of 24 upon receipt of a contract to build 50 wooden drilling rigs for a wildcatter in Luling, Texas. Knowing he could benefit from his father's long-time experience in the lumber and oilfield construction businesses, Ralph made John Raymond McDermott a partner and the company's namesake.

In 1930, it expanded the business from its original headquarters in Eastland, Texas, to Luling after a boom in oil exploration in the area. In 1932, the company moved to Houston, Texas with the continuing oil boom. It provided different services to the oil industry through three McDermott family-owned businesses: J. Ray McDermott & Co., Elmax Construction, and Stall & McDermott.

1937 saw the hiring of the company's first construction crew, a team of six. The company opened a New Orleans, Louisiana office. In 1938, the company introduced the first use of floating drilling equipment in low-lying marshlands of Texas and Louisiana. The following year, it purchased J.G. McMullen Dredging Company and established it as the Olsen Dredging Company.

In 1946, the company reorganized the multiple McDermott family business operations into one: J. Ray McDermott & Co., Inc. of Delaware. The following year, the company designed and installed the first fixed platform made of steel out-of-sight-of-land, in 20 feet of water in the Gulf of Mexico for Superior Oil. It also established a contracting division, which was the major operating segment during the early years.

In 1948, it acquired assets of Harry F. Allsman Company, McDermott's joint venture partner for several contracting jobs in the Gulf of Mexico, which provided equipment to meet the new demand for offshore construction. In 1949, the company was commissioned the construction of the first vessel designed specifically for offshore work (Derrick Barge 4). The company's Oil Division was also organized.

Restructuring
In 2010, McDermott International share-holders agreed to spin off the U.S.-based government contracting services company Babcock & Wilcox and its related other domestic companies.  The oil & gas services company, J. Ray McDermott, discontinued use of the J. Ray McDermott brand; and continued its oil & gas services contracting under the name McDermott International. The company is led by Chairman, President, and CEO David Dickson.

2017–2018
On December 18, 2017, CB&I and McDermott agreed to combine and form a fully vertically integrated onshore-offshore company. The merger was approved in May 2018.  In March 2018, the company announced that it had new business with Baker Hughes and BP, with David Dickson still CEO. CB&I's stock ceased being listed on the NYSE on May 11, 2018. Gary P. Luquette was the chairman of the combined company.   In May 2018 the company became a member of the S&P MidCap 400, replacing Diebold Nixdorf.

In August 2018, McDermott signed a contract with Shell to work on the Perdido development in the Gulf of Mexico. Also, that month, the company was sued by TechnipFMC over allegedly stolen trade secrets.

Post combination 
After the combination, McDermott discovered their due diligence fell short and realized new losses. Losses were widespread. LNG projects in Hackberry, LA & Freeport, TX had losses in the billions. Losses in Power were in the hundreds of millions. McDermott faced a PR nightmare when stock prices fell. Executive Management tried to sell assets with no success. A portion of Pipe Fabrication was sold at a loss. CB&I legacy Tanks division did not sell for an acceptable price.

Cashflow issues ensued. Account payable Invoices were not paid. The construction of the new McDermott headquarters at Energy Center 5 was halted due to non-payment. In efforts to keep the operation functioning, McDermott secured a $1.7B credit deal. This deal carries super senior credit terms that are structured with the "kind of terms they would receive if they were to convert their debt to a debtor-in-possession loan in bankruptcy."

The company purchased Siluria Technologies, which developed oxidative coupling of methane processes, in 2019.

McDermott released their 2019-Q3 earnings with no earnings call. They posted a $1.9B loss.

2020 bankruptcy 
On January 21, 2020, McDermott announced that it had filed for Chapter 11 bankruptcy, cancelling all shares of common stock.

The bankruptcy case was filed as prepackaged restructuring in the United States District Court for the Southern District of Texas and includes the parent company, McDermott International, Inc. and 247 affiliated companies.  The primary case is identified as case number 20-30336.

In June 2020, McDermott was released from Chapter 11 bankruptcy.

Marine fleet 
As of 2018, the company had a number of marine vessels.
 Amazon (leased not owned)
 Derrick Barge 27
 Derrick Barge 30
 Derrick Barge 32
 Derrick Barge 50
 Derrick Lay Vessel 2000
 Emerald Sea
 Intermac 650
 Lay Vessel 108
 Lay Vessel North Ocean 105
 North Ocean 102
 Thebaud Sea

References 

Companies listed on the New York Stock Exchange
Construction and civil engineering companies established in 1923
Tax inversions
Companies that filed for Chapter 11 bankruptcy in 2020
1923 establishments in Texas
Companies based in Houston
Companies of Panama
Construction and civil engineering companies of the United States
American companies established in 1923